The discography of American R&B and jazz singer Chanté Moore consists of six studio albums, two collaborative albums, twenty-three singles, twenty collaborations and eleven music videos. Moore has had four record deals with MCA Records, Arista Records/LaFace Records, Peak Records and Shanachie Records, before founding CM7 Records.

She released her debut album Precious on September 29, 1992, through MCA Records. The album peaked at number 101 on the Billboard 200 and number 20 on the Top R&B/Hip-Hop Albums and was certified gold by the Recording Industry Association of America (RIAA) on November 14, 1994. Her debut single "Love's Taken Over" (1992) peaked at number 86 on US Billboard Hot 100, number 13 on the US Hot R&B/Hip-Hop Songs chart in the United States and number 54 on the UK Singles Chart in the United Kingdom. Her second single "It's Alright" (1993) peaked at number 13 on the US Hot R&B/Hip-Hop Songs chart. Her third "As If We Never Met" charted at number 86 on the US Hot R&B/Hip-Hop Songs chart and her fourth single "Who Do I Turn To" peaked at number 86 on the US Hot R&B/Hip-Hop Songs chart.

She released her second studio album, A Love Supreme on November 15, 1994, through MCA Records. The album peaked at number 64 on the Billboard 200 and number 11 on the Top R&B/Hip-Hop Albums chart. The lead single "Old School Lovin'" (1994) reached the top 20 on the Hot R&B/Hip-Hop Songs chart charting at number 19. The second single "This Time" (1994) charted at number 61 on the Hot R&B/Hip-Hop Songs chart and number 5 on the US Dance Club Songs chart. Third single, "Free/Sail On" (1995) charted at number 11 on the US Dance Club Songs chart and 69 in the United Kingdom on the UK Singles Chart. Fourth single, "I'm What You Need" (1995) charted at number 56 on the Hot R&B/Hip-Hop Songs chart. This Moment Is Mine was released as Moore's third studio album through MCA Records on May 25, 1999, being her first album in over four years. The album peaked at number 31 on the Billboard 200 and number 7 on the Top R&B/Hip-Hop Albums chart. The lead single "Chante's Got a Man" (1999) became her first top 10 single on the US Billboard Hot 100, charting at number 10; number 2 on the Hot R&B/Hip-Hop Songs chart and number 34 on the US Dance Club Songs chart. "I See You in a Different Light" (1999) with singer Joel "Jo-Jo" Hailey from American R&B duo K-Ci & JoJo, was released as the album's second and final single. The song charted at number 61 on the Hot R&B/Hip-Hop Songs chart.

She released her fourth studio album, Exposed, on November 14, 2000 through MCA Records. The album peaked at number 50 on the Billboard 200 and number 10 on the Top R&B/Hip-Hop Albums chart. "Straight Up" (2000) was released as the album's lead single. The song charted at number 83 on the US Billboard Hot 100, number 22 on the Hot R&B/Hip-Hop Songs chart in the United States and number 11 on the UK Singles Chart in the United Kingdom. The second single "Bitter" (2001) charted at number 55 on the Hot R&B/Hip-Hop Songs chart. The third single "Take Care of Me" failed to chart. On February 11, 2003, Moore released her first collaborative album Things That Lovers Do was released with her former husband and fellow R&B singer Kenny Lattimore, through Arista Records. The album peaked at number 31 on the Billboard 200 and number 3 on the Top R&B/Hip-Hop Albums chart. There were two singles released from the album "Loveable (From Your Head to Your Toes)" and "You Don't Have to Cry" which peaked at number 19 and 30 on the Adult R&B Songs chart respectively. On October 10, 2006, Moore and Lattimore released their second collaborative album Uncovered/Covered through LaFace Records and Verity Records. The album peaked at number 95 on the Billboard 200, number 10 on the Top R&B/Hip-Hop Albums chart and number 2 on the Top Gospel Albums Chart. Three singles were released from the album; "Tonight (2-Step)" and "Figure It Out", which both peaked within the US Adult R&B top 40 and "Make Me Like The Moon".

Love the Woman was released as Moore's fifth studio album on June 17, 2008, through Peak Records. The album peaked at number 110 on the Billboard 200 and number 14 on the Top R&B/Hip-Hop Albums chart. The lead single "It Ain't Supposed to Be This Way" (2008) peaked at number 21 on the US Adult R&B Songs chart. She released her sixth album Moore is More on July 30, 2013, through Shanachie Records. The album peaked at number 184 on the Billboard 200, number 14 on the Top R&B/Hip-Hop Albums chart and number 32 on the Independent Albums Chart. Two singles were released from the album "Talking in My Sleep" and "Jesus, I Want You", both failed to impact in the United States and therefore failed to chart there.

In 2017, Moore released her seventh studio album The Rise of the Phoenix which peaked at number 46 on the R&B/Hip-Hop Albums Sales chart. Lead single "Real One" peaked at number 10 on the US Adult R&B Songs chart and number 39 on the US R&B/Hip-Hop Airplay chart; making "Real One" Moore's highest appearance on both charts since "Bitter" (2000). The album's second single, "Something to Remember" became Moore's 17th top 40 appearance on the Adult R&B chart, peaking at number 27. Later that year, Moore released her eighth studio album and holiday debut, Christmas Back to You. The album's release was preceded by the single "Cover Me in Snow".

In 2018, Moore released the single "One Love" from the EP 1 of 4. Released on April 5, 1 of 4 is the first of four EPs to be released in 2018.

Albums

Studio albums

Collaborative albums

Compilation albums

EPs

Singles

As lead artist

As featured artist

Other charted songs

Album appearances
{| class="wikitable plainrowheaders" style="text-align: center;" border="1"
! scope="col" style="width:10em;"| Title
! scope="col" style="width:1em;"| Year
! scope="col" style="width:14em;"| Artist
! scope="col" style="width:14em;" | Album
|-
! scope="row"|"Listen to the Message" 
|1988
|Club Nouveau
|Listen to the Message
|-
! scope="row"|"Lock-N-Key" 
|rowspan="4"|1989
|rowspan="4"|Mikki Bleu
|rowspan="4"|I Promise
|-
! scope="row"|"Something Real" 
|-
! scope="row"|"Knocks Me Off My Feet" 
|-
! scope="row"|"Stand" 
|-
! scope="row"|"What's Nest?" 
|rowspan="2"|1991
|rowspan="2"|Dee Harvey
|rowspan="2"|Just As I Am
|-
! scope="row"|"I Don't Know Yet" 
|-
! scope="row"|"Elmo Funk (Prelude) 
|rowspan="10"|1992
|rowspan="6"|El DeBarge
|rowspan="6"|In the Storm
|-
! scope="row"|"My Heart Belongs To You" 
|-
! scope="row"|"Love Me Tonight" 
|-
! scope="row"|"You Know What I Like" 
|-
! scope="row"|"In The Storm" 
|-
! scope="row"|"Thick" 
|-
! scope="row"|"When I Think Of You" 
|Everette Harp
|Everette Harp
|-
! scope="row"|"Good Enough" 
|Bobby Brown
|Bobby
|-
! scope="row"|"Fame" 
|rowspan="2"|George Duke
|rowspan="2"|Snapshots
|-
! scope="row"|"Geneva" 
|-
! scope="row"|"Between The Sheets" 
|1993
|Fourplay(featuring Chaka Khan & Nathan East)
|Between The Sheets
|-
! scope="row"|"Satisfy You" 
|rowspan="3"|1992
|rowspan="2"|Damion "Crazy Legs" Hall(with Chanté Moore)
|rowspan="2"|Straight to the Point
|-
! scope="row"|"Satisfy You (Remix)" 
|-
! scope="row"|"My Heart, Your Heart" 
|Patrice Rushen
|Anything But Ordinary
|-
! scope="row"|"Illusion" 
|1995
|George Duke
|Illusions
|-
! scope="row"|"Heal Our Land" 
|rowspan="5"|1996
|Jonathan Butler
|Celebrating The New South Africa, Place of Hope, Two Worlds Become One
|-
! scope="row"|"You're Makin Me High" 
|rowspan="3"|Toni Braxton
|rowspan="3"|Secrets
|-
! scope="row"|"Find Me A Man" 
|-
! scope="row"|"Why Should I Care" 
|-
! scope="row"|"La, La, La Means Eye Love You" 
|The Artist (Formerly Known As Prince) 
|Emancipation
|-
! scope="row"|"I Love You" 
|rowspan="3"|1998
|Keith Washington(duet with Chanté Moore)
|KW
|-
! scope="row"|"Cruisin'" 
|Nils
|Blue Planet
|-
! scope="row"|"Journey 2 The Center Of Your Heart" 
|Chaka Khan
|Come 2 My House
|-
! scope="row"|"Can We Do That?"
|rowspan="3"|1999
|Gerald McCauley
|The McCauley Sessions
|-
! scope="row"|"Down on My Knees"
|rowspan="2"|Chanté Moore
|Summer Heat Nineteen Ninety Nine – Volume One
|-
! scope="row"|"Christmas Morn"
|My Christmas Album
|-
! scope="row"|"When You Need Me" 
|rowspan="3"|2000
|Will Downing(featuring Chanté Moore)
|All The Man You Need
|-
! scope="row"|"Save Some Love For Me" 
|Fourplay
|...Yes, Please!
|-
! scope="row"|"She's Amazing"
|George Duke
|Cool
|-
! scope="row"|"Contagious" 
|rowspan="4"|2001
|The Isley Brothers(featuring R. Kelly and Chanté Moore)
|Eternal
|-
! scope="row"|"Girls, Girls, Girls (Part 2)" 
|Jay-Z
|The Blueprint
|-
! scope="row"|"This Time Next Year" 
|Toni Braxton
|Snowflakes
|-
! scope="row"|"We Are Family"
|We Are Family Collective
|We Are Family (Single)
|-
! scope="row"|"Feeling The Way"
|rowspan="2"|2002
|Norman Brown
|''Just Chillin|-
! scope="row"|"One More Time" 
|Kenny G(featuring Chanté Moore)
|Paradise
|-
! scope="row"|"Wanderer's Song"
|2003
|Chanté Moore
|Yourself... Myself
|-
! scope="row"|"Til You Come Back To Me" 
|2005
|The Rippingtons featuring Russ Freeman(featuring Chanté Moore)
|Wild Card
|-
! scope="row"|"The Windows of the World" 
|2006
|Dionne Warwick(with Angie Stone, Chanté Moore, Deborah Cox and Da Brat)
|My Friends & Me
|-
! scope="row"|"Santa Baby" 
|2007
|Boney James(featuring Chanté Moore)
|Christmas Present
|-
! scope="row"|"Atmosphere Of Faith" 
|2010
|Kevin LeVar & One Sound(featuring Chanté Moore)
|Let's Come Together
|-
! scope="row"|"Where Is The Love" 
|2013
|Phil Perry(duet with Chanté Moore)
|Say Yes
|-
! scope="row"|"Change" 
|rowspan="2"|2015
|Young Twaun(featuring Chanté Moore)
|Change (Single)
|-
! scope="row"|"Best of the Best" 
|Terri Lyne Carrington(featuring Chanté Moore)
|The Mosaic Project: Love And Soul
|-
! scope="row"|"Holding You" 
|rowspan="2"|2017
|Norman Brown(featuring Chanté Moore)
|Let It Go
|-
! scope="row"|"Higher" 
|Simon Law(featuring Chanté Moore)
|Look to the Sky
|}Notes  signifies background/additional vocals

Soundtrack appearancesNotes'''
  signifies background/additional vocals

Music videos

As lead artist

As featured artist

Notes

References

External links
Chanté Moore on YouTube

Discographies of American artists
Rhythm and blues discographies
Soul music discographies
Pop music discographies
Jazz discographies